Fiction is Yuki Kajiura's first solo album, containing remixes of her previous anime work as well as original songs. The Japanese edition features three bonus songs.

Track listing
 "Key of the Twilight" (.hack//SIGN)
 "Cynical World"
 "Fake Wings" (.hack//SIGN)
 "Fiction"
 "Vanity"
 "Red Rose" 
 "Canta per me" (Noir)
 "Zodiacal Sign" (Aquarian Age)
 "Awaking" (Aquarian Age)
 "Open Your Heart" (.hack//SIGN)
 "Winter"
 "Salva Nos" (Noir)
 "Lullaby" (Noir)
 "Echo"

Personnel
Yuki Kajiura: Keyboard and programming
Emily Bindiger: Vocals on tracks 1, 2, 3, 4, 5, 10
Yuri Kasahara: Vocals on tracks 6, 12
Deb Lyons: Vocals on tracks 7, 11
Kaori Nishina: Vocals on tracks 8, 9
Tulivu-Donna Cumberbatch on track 13

Notes

External links
 Detailed information about the album on Yuki Kajiura's Home Page
  Victor's Website for Yuki Kajiura

Yuki Kajiura albums
2003 albums